Kenneth Anderson Kitchen (born 1932) is a British biblical scholar, Ancient Near Eastern historian, and Personal and Brunner Professor Emeritus of Egyptology and honorary research fellow at the School of Archaeology, Classics and Egyptology, University of Liverpool, England.  He specialises in the ancient Egyptian Ramesside Period (i.e., Dynasties 19-20), and the Third Intermediate Period of Egypt, as well as ancient Egyptian chronology, having written over 250 books and journal articles on these and other subjects since the mid-1950s. He has been described by The Times as "the very architect of Egyptian chronology".

Third Intermediate Period
His 1972 book is The Third Intermediate Period in Egypt (1100–650 BC). It noted a hitherto unknown period of coregency between Psusennes I with Amenemope and Osorkon III with Takelot III, and established that Shebitku of the 25th Dynasty was already king of Egypt by 702 BC, among other revelations. It stated that Takelot II succeeded Osorkon II at Tanis, whereas most Egyptologists today accept it was Shoshenq III. Secondly, the book presented King Shoshenq II as the High Priest of Amun Shoshenq C, a son of Osorkon I who predeceased his father. However, this interpretation is weakened by the fact that no objects from Shoshenq II's intact burial at Tanis bears Osorkon I's name. Finally, contra Kitchen, most Egyptologists today such as Rolf Krauss, Aidan Dodson and Jürgen von Beckerath accept David Aston's argument that the Crown Prince Osorkon B, Takelot II's son, assumed power as Osorkon III, a king of the 'Theban Twenty-Third Dynasty' in Upper Egypt.

Ramesside Period
Kenneth Kitchen is regarded as one of the foremost scholars on the Ramesside Period of the New Kingdom; he published a well-respected book on Ramesses II in 1982 titled Pharaoh Triumphant: The Life and Times of Ramesses II, King of Egypt. Kitchen is a scholar who advocates a high view of the Old Testament and its inherent historicity. His 2003 book On the Reliability of the Old Testament documents several clear or indirect allusions to King David's status as the founder of Ancient Israel, based on passages in the Tel Dan ('House of David') and Mesha stelas as well as in Shoshenq I's Karnak list.

Kitchen has strongly criticized the new chronology views of David Rohl, who posits that the Biblical Shishak who invaded the Kingdom of Judah in 925 BC was actually Ramesses II rather than Shoshenq I and argues that the 21st and 22nd Dynasties of Egypt were contemporary with one another due to the absence of Dynasty 21 Apis Bull stele in the Serapeum.  Kitchen observes that the word Shishak is closer philologically to Shoshenq I and that this Pharaoh records in his monuments at Thebes that he campaigned actively against Ancient Israel and Judah.

Biblical scholarship
Kitchen is a biblical maximalist and has published frequently defending the historicity of the Old Testament.  He is an outspoken critic of the documentary hypothesis, publishing various articles and books upholding his viewpoint, arguing that the Bible is historically reliable. Kitchen has also published articles for the Biblical Archaeology Review including, 'Where Did Solomon's Gold Go?' (1989), 'Shishak's Military Campaign in Israel Confirmed' (1989), 'The Patriarchal Age: Myth or History?' (1995) and 'How we know when Solomon ruled' (2001).

Bibliography
2012. Treaty, Law and Covenant in the Ancient Near East. 3 Volumes. Wiesbaden: Harrassowitz
2009. Egyptian New Kingdom Topographical Lists, in "Causing His Name to Live: Studies in Egyptian Epigraphy and History in Memory of William J. Murnane," Brill 
2003. On the Reliability of the Old Testament. Grand Rapids and Cambridge: William B. Eerdmans Publishing Company. 
2002.  Kenneth A. Kitchen, Ancient Egyptian Chronology for Aegeanists, MAA 2, Dec 2002
1999. Poetry of Ancient Egypt. Jonsered: P. Aströms förlag.
1994. Documentation for Ancient Arabia. Part 1: Chronological Framework and Historical Sources. The World of Ancient Arabia 1. Liverpool: Liverpool University Press
1982. Pharaoh Triumphant: The Life and Times of Ramesses II, King of Egypt. Monumenta Hannah Sheen Dedicata 2. Mississauga: Benben Publications.
1977. The Bible In Its World The Bible in its World: The Bible & Archaeology Today. Exeter: Paternoster. Downers Grove: InterVarsity Press 1978.
1972. The Third Intermediate Period in Egypt (1100–650 BC). 1972. 2nd ed. 1996. 3rd ed. Warminster: Aris & Phillips Limited, 1998.
1969–1990. Ramesside Inscriptions: Historical and Biographical. 8 Vols. Oxford: B. H. Blackwell Ltd.
1966. Ancient Orient and Old Testament Ancient Orient and Old Testament. London: Tyndale Press. Chicago: InterVarsity Press.
1962. Suppiluliuma and the Amarna Pharaohs; a study in relative chronology, Liverpool University Press

References

External links
 Review of On the Reliability of the Old Testament by the Professor of Old Testament, Denver Seminary (extensive summary)
 Review of On the Reliability of the Old Testament by the director of Jewish studies, Louisiana State University (more critical)
 [Review of On the Reliability of the Old Testament] - K. A. Kitchen's home page at University of Liverpool Some archival snapshots can be found by search engines.
 

1932 births
Living people
People from Aberdeen
20th-century archaeologists
21st-century archaeologists
20th-century British historians
21st-century British historians
20th-century Protestants
21st-century Protestants
Academics of the University of Liverpool
British biblical scholars
British evangelicals
Historians of antiquity
Old Testament scholars
Scottish Egyptologists